The 2016–17 Cypriot First Division was the 78th season of the Cypriot top-level football league. The season began on 20 August 2016 and ended on 21 May 2017. The fixtures were announced on 7 July 2016. APOEL were the defending champions.

APOEL were crowned champions for the 26th time and a fifth time in a row, securing the title after beating title arch-rivals Omonia 3–1 at the GSP Stadium on 13 May 2017.

Teams

Promotion and relegation (pre-season)
Enosis Neon Paralimni and Ayia Napa were relegated at the end of the first-phase of the 2015–16 season after finishing in the bottom two places of the table. They were joined by Pafos FC, who finished at the bottom of the second-phase relegation group.

The relegated teams were replaced by 2015–16 Second Division champions Karmiotissa, runners-up AEZ Zakakiou and third-placed team Anagennisi Deryneia.

Stadia and locations

Note: Table lists clubs in alphabetical order.

Personnel and kits
Note: Flags indicate national team as has been defined under FIFA eligibility rules. Players and Managers may hold more than one non-FIFA nationality.

Managerial changes

Regular season

League table

Results

Positions by round
The table lists the positions of teams after each week of matches.

Championship round

Table

Results

Positions by round
The table lists the positions of teams after each week of matches.

Relegation round

Table

Results

Positions by round
The table lists the positions of teams after each week of matches.

Season statistics

Top scorers
Including matches played on 21 May 2017; Source: Cyprus Football Association

Top assists
Updated to games played 21 May 2017; Source: kerkida.net

Hat-tricks

 4 Player scored 4 goals.

Scoring
First goal of the season: 1 minutes and 6 seconds –  Matt Derbyshire (Omonia) against Ermis (18:02 EET, 20 August 2016)
Fastest goal of the season: 0 minutes and 48 seconds –  Ivan Tričkovski (AEK) against Ermis (26 February 2017)
Latest goal of the season: 96 minutes and 58 seconds –  Fotios Papoulis (Apollon) against AEL (7 January 2017)
First scored penalty kick of the season: 1 minutes and 6 seconds –  Matt Derbyshire (Omonia) against Ermis (18:02 EET, 20 August 2016)
First own goal of the season: 51 minutes and 44 seconds –  Albert Serrán (Doxa) for AEK (20:07 EET, 14 September 2016)
Most goals scored in a match by one player: 4 goals
 Nassir Maachi (Nea Salamina) against AEZ (24 September 2016)
 Nika Kacharava (Ethnikos) against Karmiotissa (29 October 2016)
Most scored goals in a single fixture – 30 goals (Fixture 24)
Fixture 24 results: Aris 4–0 Anagennisi, Nea Salamina 1–3 Doxa, AEZ 0–4 Ermis, AEK 4–2 Omonia, Apollon 3–0 Karmiotissa, Anorthosis 4–2 Ethnikos, APOEL 3–0 AEL.
 Highest scoring game: 8 goals
Ethnikos 5–3 Anagennisi (1 October 2016)
Karmiotissa 5–3 Ethnikos (12 March 2017)
 Largest winning margin: 7 goals
APOEL 7–0 AEZ (22 January 2017)
 Most goals scored in a match by a single team: 7 goals
APOEL 7–0 AEZ (22 January 2017)
 Most goals scored by a losing team: 3 goals
Ethnikos 5–3 Anagennisi (1 October 2016)
Karmiotissa 5–3 Ethnikos (12 March 2017)
Anorthosis 4–3 Omonia (29 April 2017)
Ermis 3–4 Ethnikos (21 May 2017)

Discipline
 First yellow card of the season: 42 minutes –  Bruno Nascimento for Omonia against Ermis (18:42 EET, 20 August 2016)
 First red card of the season: 88 minutes –  Dimitris Froxylias for Nea Salamina against Apollon (21:43 EET, 20 August 2016)
 Most yellow cards in a single match: 11
 APOEL 1–1 Anorthosis – 4 for APOEL (Vander Vieira, Kostakis Artymatas, Zhivko Milanov, Roger Cañas) and 7 for Anorthosis (Shehu Abdullahi, Airam López, Rubén Rayos, Nikola Mitrović, Carlitos, Gabriel de Moura, Dimitris Giannoulis) (23 April 2017)
 Apollon 1–1 Anorthosis – 5 for Apollon (Valentin Roberge, Fotios Papoulis, Mário Sérgio, Anton Maglica, João Pedro) and 6 for Anorthosis (Shehu Abdullahi (2), João Victor, Filipe Oliveira, Iñigo Calderón, Dimitris Giannoulis) (14 May 2017)
 Most red cards in a single match: 2
 Apollon 3–2 AEK – 1 for Apollon (Valentin Roberge) and 1 for AEK (Ivan Tričkovski) (18 March 2017)
 AEK 1–0 Anorthosis – 2 for Anorthosis (João Victor, Guilherme Santos) (12 April 2017)
 AEK 1–1 AEL – 1 for AEK (Jorge Larena) and 1 for AEL (Núrio Fortuna) (13 May 2017)

References

External links
 uefa.com

Cypriot First Division seasons
Cyprus
1